Hernán Larraín Fernández (born September 21, 1947) is a conservative Chilean lawyer, university lecturer, and politician; he served as the Chilean Minister of Justice and Human rights, appointed by president Sebastián Piñera, between 2018 and 2022. Larraín's former public service positions include a Senate seat representing the 11th district, the Maule Region (1994-2010), the Presidency of the Senate (2004-2005) and the  presidency of the Independent Democratic Union (Unión Demócrata Independiente, UDI) from 2006 to 2008 and 2015–2017. The UDI is a conservative political party with strong links to the Opus Dei, that opposes abortion and has historically supported Augusto Pinochet dictatorship. His appointment as Minister of Justice and Human rights has been controversial despite his attempt to distance himself from the UDI's ideology regarding human rights to achieve a more conciliatory tone as a minister.

Larraín is married to Magdalena Matte, a Chilean civil engineer, businesswoman and politician involved in the Kodama case. They have six children, among them is Pablo Larraín, a well known film maker. Hernán Larraín is of Basque descent. He is also a member of Washington D.C. based think tank the Inter-American Dialogue.

Early years

Hernán Larraín was born in Santiago de Chile. He studied at the Saint George's College. He entered the School of Law at the Pontifical Catholic University of Chile and received a law degree in 1971. At the university, Larraín obtained the "J.Tocornal" and "P.Montenegro" awards, given to the best student of the class. Larraín received a scholarship from the Ford Foundation to pursue his Master of Laws (LL.M.) degree at the London School of Economics.

Larraín has been professor of the School of Law at the Pontifical Catholic University of Chile, where he served as secretary-general. Despite having belonged to the Gremialista movement, he did not join the Independent Democratic Union until after the assassination of its founder Jaime Guzmán in 1991.

References

External links 

 Official site of Hernán Larraín
Biography on Senado.cl
Biography on BCN.cl, National Congressional Library

1947 births
Living people
20th-century Chilean lawyers
21st-century Chilean lawyers
Candidates for President of Chile
Academic staff of the Pontifical Catholic University of Chile
Chilean Ministers of Justice
Chilean people of Basque descent
Independent Democratic Union politicians
Hernan
Members of the Inter-American Dialogue
Members of the Senate of Chile
People from Santiago
Pontifical Catholic University of Chile alumni
Presidents of the Pontifical Catholic University of Chile Student Federation
Presidents of the Senate of Chile